Ebrahim Afsharpour (born 8 October 1930) is an Iranian boxer. He competed in the 1952 Summer Olympics.

References

External links

1930 births
Possibly living people
Boxers at the 1952 Summer Olympics
Iranian male boxers
Olympic boxers of Iran
Light-welterweight boxers
20th-century Iranian people